Hooleya is a genus of planthoppers belonging to the family Achilidae.

Species:
 Hooleya indecisa Cockerell, 1922

References

Achilidae